H. B. Van Duzer Forest State Scenic Corridor is a  scenic driving route along Route 18 in Lincoln, Tillamook, and Polk counties in the U.S. state of Oregon that passes through a forested corridor. The Van Duzer Corridor stretches from northwestern Polk County to Lincoln City, passing through the Northern Oregon Coast Range.

The forest corridor was named for Henry B. Van Duzer, a member of the Oregon State Highway Commission and president of the Inman Poulson Logging Company, who was appointed by Governor I. L. Patterson as the first chairman of the Oregon State Parks Commission in 1929. The land, purchased by the State of Oregon between 1935 and 1942, is managed by the Oregon Parks and Recreation Department, which also maintains a scenic rest stop on the route.

An old growth Douglas-fir forest is located along the Salmon River. Roosevelt elk can be seen along the route.

See also
 Little Nestucca River
 South Yamhill River

References

State parks of Oregon
Roads in Oregon
Protected areas of Lincoln County, Oregon
Protected areas of Tillamook County, Oregon
Protected areas of Polk County, Oregon
Forests of Oregon
Mountain passes of Oregon
Valleys of Oregon
Transportation in Tillamook County, Oregon
Transportation in Lincoln County, Oregon
Transportation in Polk County, Oregon